Jack Doherty (10 March 1921 – 16 February 1998) was an  Australian rules footballer who played with North Melbourne in the Victorian Football League (VFL).

Doherty was recruited from Ballarat.

Notes

External links 

1921 births
1998 deaths
Australian rules footballers from Victoria (Australia)
North Melbourne Football Club players
Wangaratta Rovers Football Club players